The 2019 AFC U-20 Futsal Championship qualification is the qualification process organized by the Asian Football Confederation (AFC) to determine the participating teams for the 2019 AFC U-20 Futsal Championship. Players born after 1 January 1999 were eligible to compete in the tournament.

A total of 12 teams qualify to play in the final tournament.

Draw
Of the 47 AFC member associations, a total of 23 teams entered the competition. The qualification process is divided into four zones: ASEAN Zone, Central Zone, East Zone and West Zone (no teams from South Zone entered qualification). The 12 spots in the final tournament are distributed as follows:
Hosts: 1 spot
ASEAN Zone: 3 spots
Central Zone: 3 spots
East Zone: 2 spots
West Zone: 3 spots

As the final tournament hosts had not been announced at the time of the qualifying draw, the hosts were also included in the draw. Despite having automatically qualified for the final tournament, they may still decide to participate in qualification, and if they finish in one of the qualification spots, the next best team in their zone also qualifies.

The draw for the qualifiers was held on 30 August 2018, 15:00 MYT (UTC+8), at the AFC House in Kuala Lumpur, Malaysia. The mechanism of the draw for each zone is as follows:
ASEAN Zone: Five teams entered the competition, and they were placed into one group, so no draw was necessary. The top three teams qualify for the final tournament.
Central Zone: Initially five teams entered the competition, and they were placed into one group, so no draw was necessary. However, after Uzbekistan were added, a re-draw for the Central Zone was held on 18 September 2018 at the AFC House in Kuala Lumpur, Malaysia. The six teams were drawn into two groups of three. The winners of each group, and the winners of the play-off between the runners-up, qualify for the final tournament.
East Zone: Six teams entered the competition, and they were drawn into two groups of three. The winners of each group qualify for the final tournament.
West Zone: Six teams entered the competition, and they were drawn into two groups of three. The winners of each group, and the winners of the play-off between the runners-up, qualify for the final tournament.

The teams were seeded according to their performance in the 2017 AFC U-20 Futsal Championship final tournament.

Notes
Teams in bold qualified for the final tournament. Saudi Arabia, which originally qualified, withdrew and were replaced by Hong Kong.
(H): Qualification hosts

Format
In each group, teams play each other once at a centralised venue.

Tiebreakers
Teams are ranked according to points (3 points for a win, 1 point for a draw, 0 points for a loss), and if tied on points, the following tiebreaking criteria are applied, in the order given, to determine the rankings (Regulations Article 11.5):
Points in head-to-head matches among tied teams;
Goal difference in head-to-head matches among tied teams;
Goals scored in head-to-head matches among tied teams;
If more than two teams are tied, and after applying all head-to-head criteria above, a subset of teams are still tied, all head-to-head criteria above are reapplied exclusively to this subset of teams;
Goal difference in all group matches;
Goals scored in all group matches;
Penalty shoot-out if only two teams are tied and they met in the last round of the group;
Disciplinary points (yellow card = 1 point, red card as a result of two yellow cards = 3 points, direct red card = 3 points, yellow card followed by direct red card = 4 points);
Drawing of lots.

ASEAN Zone
The ASEAN Zone qualifiers are played between 5–9 December 2018.
All matches are held in Thailand.
Times listed are UTC+7.

Central Zone
The Central Zone qualifiers are played between 1–4 December 2018.
All matches are held in Uzbekistan.
Times listed are UTC+5.

Group A

Group B

Play-off
Winner qualifies for 2019 AFC U-20 Futsal Championship.

As Iran were confirmed as the final tournament hosts on 5 December 2018, loser also qualifies for 2019 AFC U-20 Futsal Championship.

East Zone
The East Zone qualifiers are played between 1–3 December 2018.
All matches are held in Mongolia.
Times listed are UTC+8.

Group A

Group B

West Zone
The West Zone qualifiers are played between 6–9 December 2018.
All matches are held in United Arab Emirates.
Times listed are UTC+4.

Group A

Group B

Play-off
Winner qualifies for 2019 AFC U-20 Futsal Championship.

Saudi Arabia later withdrew and were replaced by Hong Kong.

Qualified teams
The following 12 teams qualified for the final tournament. Saudi Arabia, which originally qualified, withdrew and were replaced by Hong Kong.

1 Bold indicates champions for that year. Italic indicates hosts for that year.

Goalscorers

References

External links
, the-AFC.com
AFC U-20 Futsal Championship 2019, stats.the-AFC.com

2019 qualification
U-20 Futsal Championship
2018 in youth association football
December 2018 sports events in Asia